David Foster Wallace (1962–2008) was an American author of novels, essays, and short stories. In addition to writing, Wallace was employed as a professor at Illinois State University in Normal, Illinois, and Pomona College in Claremont, California.

Fiction

Novels 
 The Broom of the System (1987). 
 Infinite Jest (1996).  
 The Pale King (2011, posthumous).

Short story collections
 Girl with Curious Hair (1989).  
 Brief Interviews with Hideous Men (1999).  
 Oblivion: Stories (2004).

Short fiction
 1984: "The Planet Trillaphon As It Stands In Relation to The Bad Thing", Amherst Review
 2009: republished in Tin House
 1985: "Mr. Costigan in May", Clarion
 1987: included in BOTS
 1987: "Lyndon", Arrival
 1989: included in Girl with Curious Hair
 1987: "Here and There", Fiction
 1989: included in Girl with Curious Hair
 1987: "Other Math", Western Humanities Review
 1987: "Say Never", Florida Review
 1989: included in Girl with Curious Hair
 1987: "Solomon Silverfish", Sonora Review
 1988: "John Billy", Conjunctions
 1989: included in Girl with Curious Hair
 1988: "Late Night", Playboy
 1989: included in Girl with Curious Hair as "My Appearance"
 1988: "Everything is Green", Puerto del Sol
 1989: reprinted in Harper's
 1989: included in Girl with Curious Hair
 1988: "Little Expressionless Animals", Paris Review
 1989: included in Girl with Curious Hair
 1989: "Crash of 69", Between C&D
 1989: "Luckily the Account Representative Knew CPR" in Girl with Curious Hair
 1989: "Girl with Curious Hair" in Girl with Curious Hair
 1989: "Westward the Course of Empire Takes Its Way" in Girl with Curious Hair
 1991: "Church Not Made With Hands", Rampike
 1999: included in BIHM
 1991: "Forever Overhead", Fiction International
 1999: reprinted in BIHM
 1991: "Order and Flux in Northampton", Conjunctions
 1992: "Rabbit Resurrected", Harper's
1993: "The Awakening of My Interest in Annular Systems", Harper's
Excerpt from Infinite Jest
1994 "Several Birds", The New Yorker
Excerpt from Infinite Jest
1995 "An Interval", The New Yorker
Excerpt from Infinite Jest
 1997: "Death Is Not The End", Grand Street
 1999: reprinted (extended) in Brief Interviews with Hideous Men
 1998: "A Radically Condensed History of Postindustrial Life", Ploughshares, Spring 1998
 1999: reprinted (slightly extended) in Brief Interviews with Hideous Men
 1998: "Brief Interviews with Hideous Men", Harper's
 1999: reprinted (extended, but with interview 16 omitted) in Brief Interviews with Hideous Men
 1998: "The Depressed Person", Harper's
1999: "Asset", The New Yorker
 Reprinted in Brief Interviews with Hideous Men
1999: "Another Example of the Porousness of Various Borders (VI): Projected but not Improbable Transcript of Author's Parents' Marriage's End, 1971.", McSweeney's, Issue No.3, Late Summer, Early Fall, 1999
 Printed in its entirety on the spine of the issue
 Reprinted in Brief Interviews with Hideous Men
2002: "Peoria (4)", TriQuarterly #112
Excerpt from The Pale King
2002: "Peoria (9)", TriQuarterly #112
Excerpt from The Pale King
 2007: "Good People", The New Yorker
Excerpt from The Pale King
2008: "The Compliance Branch",  Harper's
Excerpt from The Pale King
2009 "Wiggle Room", The New Yorker
Excerpt from The Pale King
2009 "All That", The New Yorker
2010 "A New Examiner,"  Harper's
Excerpt from The Pale King
2011 "Backbone", The New Yorker
Excerpt from The Pale King
2013 "The Awakening of My Interest in Advanced Tax", Madra Press
Excerpt from The Pale King
2022 "Something To Do With Paying Attention", Simon and Schuster 
Excerpt from The Pale King

Nonfiction
Dates for entries in collections are the dates printed after the piece in the collection; the other dates are publication dates. Earliest dates are listed first; when they're the same the version in a collection is listed first, with the exception of Up, Simba! since the collected version references its magazine appearance and so was written afterward.

Collections 
 A Supposedly Fun Thing I'll Never Do Again (1997).  
 Consider the Lobster (2005).  
 Both Flesh and Not (2012).  [posthumous]
 String Theory: David Foster Wallace on Tennis (2016).  [posthumous, Library of America Special Edition]

Other books 
 2003: Everything and More: A Compact History of Infinity.
 2010: Fate, Time, and Language: An Essay on Free Will. Columbia University Press, 2010 [reprint]. . This text is an anthology presenting, in full, Wallace's undergraduate honors thesis in Philosophy at Amherst, "Richard Taylor's 'Fatalism' and the Semantics of Physical Modality." Additional material in the volume includes James Ryerson's introductory essay: "A Head That Throbbed Heartlike: The Philosophical Mind of David Foster Wallace"; philosopher Jay Garfield's epilogue; and philosophical essays regarding Taylor's fatalist argument.
 (2014): The David Foster Wallace Reader. . [posthumous] A collection of excerpts.

Essays 
 1985: "Richard Taylor's 'Fatalism' and the Semantics of Physical Modality" (thesis)
2010: Reprinted in Fate, Time, and Language: An Essay on Free Will (see above).
 1987: "Matters of Sense and Opacity", The New York Times letter
 1988: "Fictional Futures and the Conspicuously Young" in The Review of Contemporary Fiction 
 2012: Reprinted in Both Flesh and Not
 1990: Signifying Rappers: Rap and Race in the Urban Present (with Mark Costello)
 1990: "The Horror of Pretentiousness: 'The Great and Secret Show' by Clive Barker ", in The Washington Post
 1990: "Michael Martone's Fort Wayne is Seventh on Hitler's List", in Harvard Book Review 
 1990: "The Empty Plenum: David Markson's Wittgenstein's Mistress" in The Review of Contemporary Fiction
 2012: Reprinted in Both Flesh and Not
 1991: "Exploring Inner Space: War Fever by J.G. Ballard", in The Washington Post 
 1991: "The Million-Dollar Tattoo: Laura's Skin by F.J. Fiederspiel", in New York Times Book Review 
 1991: "Tragic Cuban Emigre and a Tale of 'The Door to Happiness':The Doorman by Reinaldo Arenas", in The Philadelphia Inquirer Book Review
 1991: "Presley as Paradigm: Dead Elvis: A Chronicle of Cultural Obsession by Greil Marcus", Los Angeles Times
 1992: "Kathy Acker's Portrait of an Eye: Three Novels", in Harvard Review
 1992: "Iris' Story: An Inversion of Philosophic Skepticism: The Blindfold by Siri Hustvedt", in The Philadelphia Inquirer
 1992: reprinted in Contemporary Literary Criticism (vol. 76)
 1992: "Tracy Austin's 'Beyond Center Court: My Story'", The Philadelphia Inquirer
 2005: reprinted in Consider the Lobster as "How Tracy Austin Broke My Heart"
 1990: "Derivative Sport in Tornado Alley", ASFTINDA
 1992: published (abbreviated) as "Tennis, Trigonometry, Tornadoes: A Midwestern Boyhood" in Harper's
 1990: "E Unibus Pluram: Television and U.S. Fiction", ASFTINDA
 1993: published (lightly edited and sans footnotes) in Review of Contemporary Fiction
 1993: "Getting Away from Already Being Pretty Much Away from It All", ASFTINDA
 1994: published as "Ticket to the Fair" in Harper's 
 1992: "Greatly Exaggerated", ASFTINDA
 1992: published as "Morte d'Author: An Autopsy" in the Harvard Book Review
 1996: "God Bless You, Mr. Franzen", Harper's letter (September 1996)
 1994: "Mr. Cogito" in Spin
2012: Reprinted in Both Flesh and Not 
 1996: "Democracy and Commerce at the US Open" in Tennis (included with NYTM)
2012: Reprinted in Both Flesh and Not 
 1996: "Impediments to Passion" in Might Magazine
 1998: reprinted as "Hail The Returning Dragon, Clothed In New Fire" in Shiny Adidas Tracksuits and the Death of Camp and Other Essays from Might Magazine
 2012: Reprinted in Both Flesh and Not as "Back in New Fire"
 1996: "Quo Vadis – Introduction", Review of Contemporary Fiction
 1995: "David Lynch Keeps His Head", ASFTINDA
 1996: published (severely abbreviated) in Premiere
 1995: "Tennis Player Michael Joyce's Professional Artistry as a Paradigm of Certain Stuff about Choice, Freedom, Discipline, Joy, Grotesquerie, and Human Completeness", ASFTINDA
 1996: published as "The String Theory" in Esquire
 1995: "A Supposedly Fun Thing I'll Never Do Again", ASFTINDA
 1996: published as "Shipping Out: On the (nearly lethal) comforts of a luxury cruise" in Harper's
 1996: "Joseph Frank's Dostoevsky", CTL
 1996: published as "Feodor's Guide" in Voice Literary Supplement (book review)
 1997: A Supposedly Fun Thing I'll Never Do Again
 1997: "Twilight of the Great Literary Beasts: John Updike, Champion Literary Phallocrat, Drops One; Is This Finally the End for the Magnificent Narcissist?", The New York Observer book review
 1998: reprinted (edited) in CTL as "Certainly the End of Something or Other, One Would Sort of Have to Think: (Re John Updike's Towards the End of Time)"
 1998: "Big Red Son", CTL
 1998: published (abbreviated and bowdlerized) as "Neither Adult Nor Entertainment" in Premiere under the names Willem R. deGroot and Matt Rundlet
 1998: "The Nature of the Fun" in Fiction Writer
 1998: published in Why I Write: Thoughts on the Craft of Fiction (Will Blythe, ed.)
 2012: Reprinted in Both Flesh and Not
 1998: "F/X Porn" in Waterstone's Magazine
 2012: Reprinted in Both Flesh and Not as "The (As It Were) Seminal Importance of Terminator 2"
 1998: "Laughing with Kafka", Harper's
 1999: reprinted (with different footnotes) in CTL as "Some Remarks on Kafka's Funniness from Which Probably Not Enough Has Been Removed"
 1999: "Overlooked: Five Direly Underappreciated U.S. Novels >1960" in Salon
 2012: Reprinted in Both Flesh and Not
 1999: "100-word statement", Rolling Stone
 2000: "Rhetoric and the Math Melodrama" (heavily edited) in Science
 2000: response to letter in response
 2012: Reprinted in Both Flesh and Not
 2000: "The Weasel, Twelve Monkeys, and the Shrub", Rolling Stone
 2000: reprinted (greatly expanded and with a preface) as Up, Simba!: 7 Days on the Trail of an Anticandidate
 2005: reprinted (verbatim) in Consider the Lobster
 2008: reprinted (with a foreword by Jacob Weisberg) as McCain's Promise: Aboard the Straight Talk Express with John McCain and a Whole Bunch of Actual Reporters, Thinking About Hope
 1999: "Authority and American Usage (or, 'Politics and the English Language' is Redundant)" in CTL
 2001: published (revised and abbreviated) as "Tense Present: Democracy, English and the wars over usage"
 2001: "The Best of the Prose Poem" in Rain Taxi
2012: Reprinted in Both Flesh and Not
 2001: "The View from Mrs. Thompson's", CTL
 2001: "9/11: The View From the Midwest" appeared in Rolling Stone, October 25, 2001 (also published online by Rolling Stone with the first title)
 2004: "Twenty-Four Word Notes" printed as "Word Note" (various) in Oxford American Writer's Thesauraus 
2012: Reprinted in Both Flesh and Not
 2004: "Borges on the Couch" in the New York Times Book Review
 See also: author's reply
2012: Reprinted in Both Flesh and Not
 2004: "Consider the Lobster", CTL
 2004: published (with slight edits and gruesome details removed) in Gourmet 
 2005: "Kenyon Commencement Address"
 2006: reprinted (revised and edited) in The Best American Nonrequired Reading 2006
 2008: reprinted (severely abridged) in The Wall Street Journal as "David Foster Wallace on Life and Work"
 2009: reprinted as This Is Water
 2005: "Host", CTL
 2005: published (abbreviated and in color) in The Atlantic
 2006: "Federer as Religious Experience", NYTM: PLAY
 2012: Reprinted in Both Flesh and Not as "Federer Both Flesh and Not"
 2007: "Deciderization 2007 — a Special Report" published as introduction to The Best American Essays 2007
2012: Reprinted in Both Flesh and Not
 2007: "Just Asking", in The Atlantic
2012: Reprinted in Both Flesh and Not
 2008: "It All Gets Quite Tricky", Harper's

Contributions
 Fiction International 19:2 (Aids Art, Photomontages from Germany and England) (1991), contributing author
 Grand Street 42 (1992), contributor
 Grand Street 46 (1993), contributor
 The Review of Contemporary Fiction: The Future of Fiction, A Forum Edited by David Foster Wallace (1996), editor
 Open City Number Five : Change or Die (1997), contributing author
 The Best American Essays 2007 (2007), guest editor
 The New Kings of Nonfiction (2007), contributing author
 The Mechanics' Institute Review, Issue 4 (September 2007)

Interviews
 Becky Bradway, "Interview with David Foster Wallace." Creating Nonfiction. Ed. Becky Bradway and Doug Hesse. Boston: Bedford/St. Martin's, 2009, 770-73.
 Larry McCaffery, "An Interview with David Foster Wallace." Review of Contemporary Fiction 13.2 (Summer 1993), 127–150. (text at Dalkey Archive Press website)
 Laura Miller, "The Salon Interview: David Foster Wallace." Salon 9 (1996).
 "The Usage Wars." Radio interview with David Foster Wallace and Bryan A. Garner. The Connection (March 30, 2001). (full audio interview)
 Caleb Crain, "Approaching Infinity: David Foster Wallace talks about writing novels, riding the Green Line, and his new book on higher math." The Boston Globe. October 26, 2003.
 Michael Goldfarb, "David Foster Wallace." radio interview for The Connection (June 25, 2004). (full audio interview)
 David Foster Wallace on Bookworm
 Charlie Rose: An interview with David Foster Wallace March 27, 1997
 Zachary Chouteau, "Infinite Zest: Words with the Singular David Foster Wallace." Bookselling This Week
 Dave Eggers, "David Foster Wallace." The Believer. November 2003.
 "Brief Interview with a Five Draft Man." Interview with Stacey Schmeidel for Amherst Magazine. Spring 1999.
 A radio interview with David Foster Wallace Aired on the Lewis Burke Frumkes Radio Show in the spring of 1999.
 2010: Lipsky, David. Although of Course You End Up Becoming Yourself: A Road Trip with David Foster Wallace. New York: Broadway, 2010.
 Wallace, David Foster. David Foster Wallace: The Last Interview: and Other Conversations. Melville House, 2012. 
 Bryan A. Garner and David Foster Wallace.  Quack This Way:  David Foster Wallace & Bryan A. Garner talk language and writing. RosePen Books, 2013.  .

Works about David Foster Wallace

Books
 Bolger, Robert K. and Korb, Scott (eds). Gesturing Toward Reality: David Foster Wallace and Philosophy. Bloomsbury Academic, 2014. 
 Boswell, Marshall. Understanding David Foster Wallace. Columbia: University of South Carolina Press, 2003. 
 Boswell, Marshall and Burn, Stephen, eds. A Companion to David Foster Wallace Studies. Palgrave Macmillan, 2013 (American Literature Readings in the Twenty-First Century). 
 Burn, Stephen. David Foster Wallace's Infinite Jest: A Reader's Guide. New York, London: Continuum, 2003. 
 Carlisle, Greg. Elegant Complexity: A Study of David Foster Wallace's Infinite Jest. Austin, TX: Sideshow Media Group Press, 2007. 
 Carlisle, Greg. Nature's Nightmare: Analyzing David Foster Wallace's Oblivion. Sideshow Media Group Press, 2013.
 Cohen, Samuel, and Konstantinou, Lee (eds.). The Legacy of David Foster Wallace. University of Iowa Press, 2012. 
 Dowling, William, and Bell, Robert. A Reader's Companion to Infinite Jest. Xlibris, 2004. 
 Hayes-Brady, Clare. The Unspeakable Failures of David Foster Wallace: Language, Identity and Resistance. New York: Bloomsbury, 2016. 
 Hering, David, ed. Consider David Foster Wallace: Critical Essays. Austin, TX: Sideshow Media Group Press, 2010.
 Hering, David. David Foster Wallace: Fiction and Form. New York: Bloomsbury, 2016.
 Jackson, Edward, Xavier Marcó del Pont, and Tony Venezia (eds.), David Foster Wallace Special Issue of Orbit: A Journal of American Literature, 22 March 2017. 
 Kelly, Adam. "David Foster Wallace and the New Sincerity in American Fiction." Consider David Foster Wallace: Critical Essay. Ed. David Hering. Austin, TX: Sideshow Media Group Press, 2010. 131–46.
 Lipsky, David. Although of Course You End Up Becoming Yourself: A Road Trip with David Foster Wallace. New York: Broadway, 2010. 
 Max, D. T. Every Love Story is a Ghost Story: A Life of David Foster Wallace. New York: Viking, 2012.
 McGowan, Michael and Brick, Martin, David Foster Wallace and Religion: Essays on Faith and Fiction. New York: Bloomsbury, 2019. 
 Miller, Adam S. The Gospel According to David Foster Wallace: Boredom and Addiction in an Age of Distraction (New Directions in Religion and Literature). New York: Bloomsbury, 2016.
 Severs, Jeffrey. David Foster Wallace's Balancing Books: Fictions of Value. New York: Columbia University Press, 2017.
 Thompson, Lucas Global Wallace (DFW Studies). New York: Bloomsbury, 2017.
 Wallace, David Foster. David Foster Wallace: The Last Interview: and Other Conversations. Melville House, 2012. 

Academic articles and book chapters
 Benzon, Kiki. "Darkness Legible, Unquiet Lines: Mood Disorders in the Fiction of David Foster Wallace." Creativity, Madness and Civilization. Ed. Richard Pine. Cambridge: Cambridge Scholars Press, 2007: 187–198.
 Bresnan, Mark. "The Work of Play in David Foster Wallace's Infinite Jest." Critique: Studies in Contemporary Fiction 50:1 (2008), 51–68.
 Burn, Stephen. "Generational Succession and a Source for the Title of David Foster Wallace's The Broom of the System." Notes on Contemporary Literature 33.2 (2003), 9–11.
 Cioffi, Frank Louis. "An Anguish Becomes Thing: Narrative as Performance in David Foster Wallace's Infinite Jest." Narrative 8.2 (2000), 161–181.
 Delfino, Andrew Steven. "Becoming the New Man in Post-Postmodernist Fiction: Portrayals of Masculinities in David Foster Wallace's Infinite Jest and Chuck Palahniuk's Fight Club. MA Thesis, Georgia State University.
 Ewijk, Petrus van. "'I' and the 'Other': The relevance of Wittgenstein, Buber and Levinas for an understanding of AA's Recovery Program in David Foster Wallace's Infinite Jest." English Text Construction 2.1 (2009), 132–45.
 Giles, Paul. "Sentimental Posthumanism: David Foster Wallace." Twentieth Century Literature 53.3 (Fall 2007): 327-44.
 Goerlandt, Iannis and Luc Herman. "David Foster Wallace." Post-war Literatures in English: A Lexicon of Contemporary Authors 56 (2004), 1–16; A1-2, B1-2.
 Goerlandt, Iannis. "Fußnoten und Performativität bei David Foster Wallace. Fallstudien." Am Rande bemerkt. Anmerkungspraktiken in literarischen Texten. Ed. Bernhard Metz & Sabine Zubarik. Berlin: Kulturverlag Kadmos, 2008: 387–408.
 Goerlandt, Iannis. "'Put the book down and slowly walk away': Irony and David Foster Wallace's Infinite Jest."  Critique: Studies in Contemporary Fiction 47.3 (2006), 309–28.
 Goerlandt, Iannis. "'Still steaming as its many arms extended': Pain in David Foster Wallace's Incarnations of Burned Children." Sprachkunst 37.2 (2006), 297–308.
 Harris, Jan Ll. Addiction and the Societies of Control: David Foster Wallace's Infinite Jest, paper delivered at Figuring Addictions/Rethinking Consumption conference, Institute for Cultural Research, Lancaster University, April 4–5, 2002.
 Hering, David. "Theorising David Foster Wallace's Toxic Postmodern Spaces." US Studies Online 18 (2011)
 Holland, Mary K. "'The Art's Heart's Purpose': Braving the Narcissistic Loop of David Foster Wallace's Infinite Jest." Critique: Studies in Contemporary Fiction 47.3 (2006), 218–42.
 Jacobs, Timothy. "The Brothers Incandenza: Translating Ideology in Fyodor Dostoevsky's The Brothers Karamazov and David Foster Wallace's Infinite Jest." Contemporary Literary Criticism Vol. 271. Ed. Jeffrey Hunter. New York: Gale, 2009. Also published in Texas Studies in Literature and Language 49.3 (2007), 265–92.
 Jacobs, Timothy. "American Touchstone: The Idea of Order in Gerard Manley Hopkins and David Foster Wallace." Comparative Literature Studies 38.3 (2001), 215–31.
 Kelly, Adam. "David Foster Wallace: the Death of the Author and the Birth of a Discipline." Irish Journal of American Studies Online 2 (2010).
 Kelly, Adam. "Development Through Dialogue: David Foster Wallace and the Novel of Ideas." Studies in the Novel 44.3 (2012): 265–81.
 Kelly, Adam. "Dialectic of Sincerity: Lionel Trilling and David Foster Wallace." Post45 Peer Reviewed (17 October 2014).
 LeClair, Tom. "The Prodigious Fiction of Richard Powers, William T. Vollmann, and David Foster Wallace." Critique: Studies in Contemporary Fiction 38.1 (1996), 12–37.
 Morris, David. "Lived Time and Absolute Knowing: Habit and Addiction from Infinite Jest to the Phenomenology of Spirit." Clio: A Journal of Literature, History and the Philosophy of History 30 (2001), 375–415.
 Nichols, Catherine. "Dialogizing Postmodern Carnival: David Foster Wallace's Infinite Jest". Critique: Studies in Contemporary Fiction 43.1 (2001), 3–16.
 Rother, James. "Reading and Riding the Post-Scientific Wave. The Shorter Fiction of David Foster Wallace". Review of Contemporary Fiction 13.2 (1993), 216–234. 
 Tysdal, Dan. "Inarticulation and the Figure of Enjoyment: Raymond Carver's Minimalism Meets David Foster Wallace's 'A Radically Condensed History of Postindustrial Life'". Wascana Review of Contemporary Poetry and Short Fiction 38.1 (2003), 66–83.

Book reviews and online essays
 Benzon, Kiki. "Mister Squishy, c'est moi: David Foster Wallace's Oblivion" electronic book review (2004).
 Esposito, Scott, et al. "Who Was David Foster Wallace? A Symposium on the Writing of David Foster Wallace". The Quarterly Conversation. Harris, Michael. "A Sometimes Funny Book Supposedly about Infinity: A Review of Everything and More". Notices of the AMS 51.6 (2004), 632–638.
 Jacobs, Tim. "The Fight: Considering David Foster Wallace Considering You". Rain Taxi Review of Books. Online Edition, Part Two. Winter 2009.
 Jacobs, Timothy. "David Foster Wallace's Infinite Jest." The Explicator 58.3 (2000), 172–75.
 Jacobs, Timothy. "David Foster Wallace's The Broom of the System." Ed. Alan Hedblad. Beacham's Encyclopedia of Popular Fiction. Detroit: Gale Research Press, 2001, 41–50.
 Kelly, Adam. "The Map and the Territory: Infinite Boston." The Millions (13 Aug 2013).
 Mason, Wyatt. "Don't like it? You don't have to play [review of Oblivion: Stories]". London Review of Books'' 26.22 (2004).

Footnotes

External links
 Uncollected DFW, a complete bibliography
 Various writings, Harper's (available without subscription)

Bibliographies by writer
Bibliographies of American writers
 
Postmodern literature bibliographies